Haplorhus is a genus of plants in the family Anacardiaceae. Haplorhus peruviana is the only species in the genus. It is found in dry ravines located in Chile and Peru.

References

 
Anacardiaceae genera
Monotypic Sapindales genera
Taxonomy articles created by Polbot